Tuleariocaris neglecta is a species of saltwater shrimp found in the Maldives that was first described in 1969. This species is found in the Caribbean sea, Gulf of Mexico and the Northern Atlantic Ocean.

References

Palaemonoidea
Crustaceans described in 1969